The murder of Michael Gilbert occurred in 2009 in the United Kingdom. His decapitated body was found in a lake in Arlesey. He had for years been kept as a slave and subjected to abuse by the Watt family, six of whom – including James Watt, the ringleader – were jailed for their role in the murder. Gilbert, who had an unstable childhood, was considered a vulnerable and naive man who was easily exploited.

After his death, reports were published by Luton Safeguarding Vulnerable Adults Board (LSVAB) and the Independent Police Complaints Commission (IPCC) which identified failings by public services involved in Gilbert's case.

Background 
Gilbert was born in 1982 into an unstable home, and spent parts of his childhood in care. He was the third of five children. The family moved frequently. In 1993, his sister accused him of having sexually assaulted her; the result of this sexual assault investigation was inconclusive. In 1997, his mother told police that Gilbert had sexually assaulted a boy. He attended Halyard High School and was bullied at school, and underwent a mastectomy when he was 13. He met Watt in 1998 when they were both living in a children's home.  He was also bullied at children's homes and seen as easy to manipulate. By 2000, Gilbert had several criminal convictions and cautions, and had spent time in prison and in a Young Offenders' Institution; Watt was also well known to the police.

Abuse and death 
After leaving the children's home, Gilbert continued to associate with Watt, moving in and out of Watt's various Luton homes until his death. While living with the Watt family, he was frequently beaten and tortured, forced to work as a slave, and had his benefit money taken from him. The abuse, some of which was captured on video, included: being stabbed, hit with a baseball bat, shot at with an air pistol, forced to drink his own urine, and forced to stand in boiling water. He was also forced to sleep chained to his bed to stop him from escaping. When he did escape, the Watt family would use his National Insurance number to find out where he was claiming his benefits so they could bring him back, although there were occasions when he returned of his own volition. Gilbert's sister was Watt's girlfriend and lived with him during the early part of the abuse; she later told the court she had seen Gilbert being attacked and had suffered violence herself.

The Watt family was described by the LSVAB report as a "caricature of the neighbours from hell", and was, according to Julian Sturdy of BBC News, "Luton's most notorious anti-social neighbours." The family, most of whom were unemployed, moved addresses continuously, kept pit-bull-type dogs and giant lizards, and were known for their violence and criminality; by 2001 the police had visited the family 112 times.

On 10 May 2009, Gilbert's decapitated body, with various other parts missing, was found in the Blue Lagoon; the head and the other parts were not found until February 2010. Detectives believe he died overnight between 21 and 22 January 2009. A murder investigation was started and several arrests were made. The pathologist who examined the body found that the aorta had been cut, there were stab wounds on the chest, and internal injuries to the stomach and intestine, but was unsure of the precise cause of death.

Trial 
The trial into the murder began in February 2010. In April, James Watt; his girlfriend, Natasha Oldfield; and Nichola Roberts, the girlfriend of James's brother Richard, were found guilty of Gilbert's murder. Richard Watt; Robert Watt, James's brother; and the mother of the brothers, Jennifer Smith-Dennis, were found guilty of familial homicide. All six were also found guilty of perverting the course of justice. Antonio Watt, the father of the brothers, was acquitted of familial homicide and perverting the course of justice. James Watt received a sentence of 36 years, Oldfield 18, Roberts 15, Richard 6, Robert 8, and Smith-Dennis 10. The judge, John Bevan, considered giving James Watt a whole-life sentence, but did not because he thought he would have regarded it as a "badge of honour". Bevan described the case as a "grotesque story", and said Michael Gilbert had died a "cruel, lonely and violent death".

In May 2011, Richard Watt had his sentence reduced to four years on appeal because he helped to convict the others and to find the other body parts. The appeals of Watt, Oldfield, and Roberts were rejected.

Aftermath 
LSVAB published a Serious Case Review in 2011 which found that the response by police, social workers and medical professionals involved in his case was inadequate. It made eight recommendations for improvement. The report said that Gilbert's childhood led to his being "literally and emotionally abandoned without consistent or predictable guidance".

A report was published by the IPCC in 2011 which found that three police investigations involving Gilbert were flawed.

Following the report by the Luton board, Trevor Holden, chief executive of Luton Borough Council, said "the council and its partners are determined to learn the lessons from this Serious Case Review".

See also
List of solved missing person cases

Notes and references 
Notes

References

Sources 
Flynn, Margaret.  . Luton Safeguarding Vulnerable Adults Board. May 2010. Retrieved 8 July 2011. 9 July 2011.

Further reading 

"Family of 'slave' give reaction" [video]. BBC News. 23 April 2010. Retrieved 10 July 2011.
"Victim's family welcomes 'slave' murderers sentences" [video]. BBC News. 26 April 2010. Retrieved 10 July 2011.
Report by Mark Worthington. "Michael Gilbert: Police lagoon victim probes 'flawed'" [video]. BBC News. 7 July 2011. Retrieved 10 July 2011.

2000s missing person cases
2009 in England
2009 murders in the United Kingdom
21st century in Bedfordshire
Formerly missing people
History of Bedfordshire
Incidents of violence against men
Luton
Male murder victims
Missing person cases in England
Modern slavery in the United Kingdom
Murder in Bedfordshire
Torture in England
Violence against men in the United Kingdom